Vernon Barlow (5 November 1909 – 24 October 1975) was a British modern pentathlete. He competed at the 1932 Summer Olympics. In 1944, he was awarded with the OBE.

References

External links
 

1909 births
1975 deaths
British male modern pentathletes
Olympic modern pentathletes of Great Britain
Modern pentathletes at the 1932 Summer Olympics
Sportspeople from Derry (city)